Where the Circle Ends (Spanish:Donde el círculo termina) is a 1956 Mexican crime film directed by Alfredo B. Crevenna and starring Sara Montiel, Raúl Ramírez and Nadia Haro Oliva.

The film's sets were designed by the art director Edward Fitzgerald.

Cast
 Sara Montiel as Isabel 
 Raúl Ramírez as Raúl del Río  
 Nadia Haro Oliva as Gabriela  
 Jorge Martínez de Hoyos as Inspector Carlos Carrillo  
 Rafael Estrada as Miguel  
 Antonio Raxel as Sr. Vélez  
 Armando Arriola as Martínez
 Daniel Arroyo as Miembro del consejo  
 Javier de la Parra as Enrique  
 Jaime Jiménez Pons as Mozo 
 Humberto Rodríguez as Hombre toma inventario  
 Fernando Torre Laphame as Joaquín Valverde  
 Yolanda Vázquez as Domitila, sirventa  
 Amado Zumaya as  forense

References

Bibliography 
 Rogelio Agrasánchez. Cine Mexicano: Posters from the Golden Age, 1936-1956. Chronicle Books, 2001.

External links 
 

1956 films
1956 crime films
Mexican crime films
1950s Spanish-language films
Films directed by Alfredo B. Crevenna
1950s Mexican films
Mexican black-and-white films